Castlewellan is a small town in County Down, in the south-east of Northern Ireland close to the Irish Sea. It lies between the Mourne Mountains and Slieve Croob. It had a population of 2,782 people in the 2011 census.

Castlewellan has a wide main street which runs through two main squares lined with chestnut trees. The town was designed by a French architect for the Annesley Family. The Annesley family did not always own the land as they bought it from The Maginess Family. (see Earl Annesley), then owners of what is now Castlewellan Christian Conference Centre and Forest Park, and is unique within Ireland due to its tree-lined squares both in the old town (upper square) and new town (lower square) as well as its very wide main street. The old market house in the upper square was built in 1764 and now houses the public library.

Places of interest
Drumena Cashel is a good example of a small stone built farmstead enclosure or cashel of the Early Christian period.
Castlewellan Forest Park and Castlewellan Lake are situated to the northwest of the village. The Arboretum in the park was begun in 1740 and contains plants and trees from many different countries including Spain, Mexico and Wales; the 'Castlewellan Gold' form of Leyland Cypress – originating from a single mutant tree in the arboretum and widely propagated from the 1970s – was selected by the park director, John Keown, being first named Cupressus macrocarpa Keownii, 1963. The Peace Maze was constructed in the park between 2000 and 2001. Until 2007 it was the longest permanent hedge maze in the world. In the very early hours of 7 April 2007 two youths died in a canoeing incident in the lake.
Castlewellan Castle, a Scottish baronial castle of 1856, overlooks the lake and the park. Nowadays the castle is used as a privately run Christian conference centre, and is not generally open to the public.
Goward Dolmen is a megalithic monument  from Hilltown on the road to Castlewellan. The huge granite capstone has slipped from its original horizontal position.

History
12 July 1849 saw the Dolly's Brae conflict. Up to 1400 armed Orangemen marched from Rathfriland to Tollymore Park near Castlewellan, County Down. On their homeward journey, shots were fired and police were unable to control the situation. None of the Orangemen were harmed, but it was estimated that about 80 Catholics were killed and homes burnt.

According to the Sunday Times Insight Team, the entire village (the population then was given as 819) was bound over to keep the peace for a year in 1953 after disorder at an Orange walk.

The Troubles
For more information see The Troubles in Castlewellan, which includes a list of incidents in Castlewellan during the Troubles resulting in two or more fatalities.

Castlewellan throughout its history, has always been a staunchly Irish Republican town. Throughout the course of The Troubles, it had a significant paramilitary presence, mostly through the presence of the Provisional Irish Republican Army (PIRA).

Schools 
St Mary's Primary School, Aughlisnafin
Annsborough Primary School
Castlewellan Primary School
St. Malachy's Primary School, Castlewellan
St. Malachy's High School, Castlewellan
Bunscoil Bheanna Boirche
Castlewellan High School: Closed in 1991.

Transport
Castlewellan railway station was opened on 24 March 1906 by the Great Northern Railway of Ireland, but closed on 2 May 1955.

Trains used to connect Newcastle and Belfast via Lisburn.

Music
The Celtic Fusion International Musical Arts Festival has been held annually in the town since 2002.

The Soma Festival is an annual festival held in the town since 2013. Soma is a festival of live music, family, well-being, food and drink and is directed by singer Tíona McSherry.

Sport
Castlewellan GAC is based in the village.
Castlewellan Town FC are the local Football team.
Castlewellan lake plays host to the Queen's Regatta, and formerly the Irish University Rowing Championships, annually in April.
Kilmegan Amateur Boxing Club is situated in the outskirts of the town (taking its name from the towns parish name).
Castlewellan Forest Park played host to the All British Open Field Archery Championships which was put on and arranged by the Ballyvally Archery Club Banbridge during the weekend of 28–29 May 2011.

Demography

2011 Census
Castlewellan is classified as an intermediate settlement by the Northern Ireland Statistics and Research Agency (NISRA) (i.e. with a population between 2,500 and 4,999 people).
On Census Day (27 March 2011) the usually resident population of Castlewellan Settlement was 2,782, accounting for 0.15% of the NI total. Of these:
 24.84% were under 16 years old and 10.96% were aged 65 and above.
 48.71% of the population were male and 51.29% were female.
 90.29% were from a Catholic community background and 6.51% were from a 'Protestant and Other Christian (including Christian related)' community background.
 54.31% indicated they had an Irish national identity, 29.58% said they had a Northern Irish national identity and 17.69% gave a British national identity (respondents could indicate more than one national identity).

2001 Census
Castlewellan is classified as an intermediate settlement by the NI Statistics and Research Agency (NISRA) (i.e. with population between 2,250 and 4,500 people).
On Census day (29 April 2001) there were 2,392 people living in Castlewellan. Of these:
29.8% were aged under 16 and 13.8% were aged 60 and over.
49.4% of the population were male and 50.6% were female.
92.1% were from a Catholic background and 6.6% were from a Protestant background
4.8% of people aged 16–74 were unemployed.

Notable people

Greer Garson, actress
Percy Jocelyn, Anglican Bishop
Niamh McGrady, actress
Eileen O'Higgins, actress
Séamus Ó Néill, Irish writer
Joe Toner, soccer player.

See also
Market Houses in Northern Ireland

References

External links

The Ins, Outs and Whereabouts of Castlewellan
Castlewellan Football Club.

Villages in County Down
Townlands of County Down
Rowing venues in the United Kingdom
Civil parish of Kilmegan